Jeff Manning, also credited as Jeffrey Manning, is an American voice actor and narrator based in Japan. He is known primarily for his work on the North American English dub of Iron Chef, as well as roles in several video games and voice-overs on numerous television commercials. He is perhaps best known as the Announcer and Master Hand in the first Nintendo 64 game Super Smash Bros. He previously worked for Mickey's Company, an agency based in Japan. He now works for Triple Sun Talent, another agency based in Japan.

Bio 
A native of Utah, and alumni of Brigham Young University, Manning first came to Japan as a missionary for the Church of Jesus Christ of Latter-day Saints. He returned there in 1983 to work for Frontier Enterprises doing studio dubbing.

Notable roles

Anime

 Azuki-chan – Billy (original Japanese dub)
 Arashi no Yoru Ni: Himitsu no Tomodachi – Butch, Ghiro, Tap    
 The Dagger of Kamui – Goldgun, Jackal
 Vengeance of the Space Pirate – Black Commander
 Free: Dive to the Future - Albert Volandel (original Japanese dub)

Live action
 Iron Chef – Kitchen Reporter Shinichiro Ohta
 Johnson and Friends – Johnson, Alfred (Japanese dub of Australian series)
 Ultra Galaxy Fight: New Generation Heroes - Voice of Ultraman Rosso
 Ultra Galaxy Fight: The Absolute Conspiracy - Voice of Ultraman Titas, Ultraman Neos and Andro Melos

Video games

 Air Gallet – Narration
 D1GP – Judge
 Ka 2: Let's Go Hawaii – various roles  
 Shenmue II – additional voices (Xbox version) 
 Unison: Rebels of Rhythm & Dance – various roles

References

External links
 
 
 Jeff Manning on Gaikokujin-Talent.com

20th-century American male actors
21st-century American male actors
American expatriates in Japan
American male video game actors
American male voice actors
Living people
People from Utah
Year of birth missing (living people)
Brigham Young University alumni